
AD 84 (LXXXIV) was a leap year starting on Thursday (link will display the full calendar) of the Julian calendar. In the Roman Empire, it was known as the Year of the Consulship of Augustus and Sabinus (or, less frequently, year 837 Ab urbe condita). The denomination AD 84 for this year has been used since the early medieval period, when the Anno Domini calendar era became the prevalent method in Europe for naming years.

Events

By place

Roman Empire  
 Possible date of the Battle of Mons Graupius (AD 83 or 84), in which Gnaeus Julius Agricola defeats the Caledonians.
 Emperor Domitian recalls Agricola back to Rome, where he is rewarded with a triumph and the governorship of the Roman province Africa, but he declines it.
 Pliny the Younger is sevir equitum Romanorum (commander of a cavalry squadron).
 The construction of the limes, a line of Roman fortifications from the Rhine to the Danube, is begun.
 Through his election as consul for ten years and censor for life, Domitian openly subordinates the republican aspect of the state to the monarchical.
 Domitian increases the troops' pay by one third, thus securing their loyalty.

Asia 
 Change from Jianchu to Yuanhe era of the Chinese Eastern Han Dynasty.

Deaths 
 Luke the Evangelist, Greek physician and martyr 
 Titus Flavius Sabinus, Roman consul and married with Julia Flavia (executed)

References 

0084